Cab or CAB may refer to:

Transport 
 Cab (locomotive), the driving compartment of a locomotive
 Cab car
 Cabin (truck), an enclosed space in a truck where the driver is seated
 Cabriolet (carriage) (obsolete), a type of horse-drawn carriage
 Civil Aeronautics Board, an agency of the federal government of the United States
 Constructions Aéronautiques du Béarn, former French aircraft manufacturer
 Controller anti-lock brake, see Anti-lock braking system
 NATO reporting name for the Lisunov Li-2, aircraft
 Taxi, a type of vehicle for hire with a driver
 Tractor unit of an articulated lorry, known in Britain as an artic cab

People 
 Cab Calloway (1907–1994), American jazz singer and bandleader
 Cris Cab (born 1993), American singer and songwriter

Fictional characters
 Cab (Transformers), a fictional character from the Transformers TV series

Places 
 Čab, a village in Nitra District in Slovakia

Buildings and structures
 Causeway Bay station, Hong Kong; MTR station code CAB
 Church Administration Building of The Church of Jesus Christ of Latter-day Saints

Music  
 The Cab, an American pop-rock band
 CAB (band), a jazz fusion band
 CAB (album), 2000
 "Cab" (song), a 2005 song by Train
 "C.A.B. (Catch a Body)", a 2022 song by Chris Brown

Computing 
 Cabinet (file format), with filename extension "CAB", a Microsoft Windows installation archive format
 Change-advisory board
 Choose and Book, UK NHS E-booking software
 Composite UI Application Block, a part of Microsoft's .NET Framework used to create user interfaces
 CA/Browser Forum (Certification Authority Browser Forum)

Sports 
 Logo of Club Atlético Banfield, a football team in Argentina
 Logo of Club Atlético Belgrano, a football team in Argentina
 Club Athlétique Bizertin, a football club from Bizerte in Tunisia
 Cricket Association of Bengal, governing body for cricket in West Bengal, India
 Curaçaose Atletiek Bond, the governing body for athletics in Curaçao

Groups, organizations, companies 
 Cambodia Asia Bank (CAB), a bank of Cambodia
 Canadian Association of Broadcasters
 Citizens Advice Bureau, UK charity giving free advice for money, legal, consumer and other issues
 Cooperative Analysis of Broadcasting, company originating the Crossley ratings for radio programs
 Credito Agrario Bresciano, defunct bank of Italy
 Criminal Assets Bureau, agency in Ireland investigating suspected proceeds of criminal conduct

Other uses 
 C.A.B., a British television show
 Cabernet Sauvignon
 Cabochon, also called "cab", a shaped, polished gemstone
 Cellulose acetate butyrate, a type of plastic
 Certified Angus Beef, meat grading designation set up by the American Angus Association
 Citizenship (Amendment) Act, 2019, a law enacted by the Parliament of India
 Combat Action Badge, a military badge worn in the U.S.
 Combat Aviation Brigade, a helicopter unit in the United States Army
 Complete or Combined Androgen Blockade (CAB), see Maximum androgen blockade, medical treatment for prostate cancer
 Comprehensive Agreement on the Bangsamoro, a peace agreement
 Comic Arts Brooklyn, an annual comics festival in Brooklyn, New York

See also

 
 KAB (disambiguation)